Ypsilanti High School (YHS) was a public school located in Ypsilanti Township, Michigan. Ypsilanti High School (or 'Ypsi High,' as many people referred to it), was a comprehensive high school serving 9–12th grades, located on the western edge of the Ypsilanti Public School District at the corner of Packard and Hewitt Roads.

When the Willow Run and Ypsilanti school districts merged to become Ypsilanti Community Schools in 2013, YHS's current campus became the newly merged district's high school: Ypsilanti Community High School.

History

Ypsilanti High School has a lengthy history, and has existed since 1849. Until 1973, the high school was housed in a historic 3-story brick building on Cross Street, which has since been converted into senior citizen housing units.

Notable alumni 

 Mike Bass – professional NFL football player who played defensive back for the Detroit Lions (1967) and the Washington Redskins (1969–1975)
 Amy Devers, designer and television personality (Freeform Furniture, Trading Spaces, Designer People)
 Rodney Holman – professional NFL football player who played tight end for the Cincinnati Bengals (1982–1992), and the Detroit Lions (1993–1995)
 Carolyn King – one of the first girls to play Little League Baseball; she was the centerpiece of a landmark lawsuit in 1973 that led to Little League dropping its boys-only policy
 Jason Lamar – professional football player
 Alfred Lucking – lawyer and Congressman from Michigan, who later became general counsel for the Ford Motor Company and the Henry Ford interests
 William McAndrew, educator who served as superintendent of Chicago Public Schools 
 Charles Ramsey – former Eastern Michigan Eagles men's basketball head coach; he played on the YHS baseball, basketball and football teams
 Don Schwall, former MLB player (Boston Red Sox, Pittsburgh Pirates, Atlanta Braves)
 Shara Worden, lead singer and songwriter for My Brightest Diamond

Notable faculty

 Byron M. Cutcheon – former YHS teacher and principal who later became an American Civil War general, Medal of Honor recipient, lawyer and Congressman from Michigan. He became principal of YHS (where he taught ancient languages, higher mathematics and mental and moral philosophy) in 1861, just before he graduated from the University of Michigan

Braves Logo Controversy
The mascot of Ypsilanti High School has been a source of controversy for over 10 years. In the early 1990s, in response to charges that the mascot was offensive to Native Americans, the first changes were undertaken. The real-life mascot, who dressed up as a stereotypical 'Indian' (complete with mohawk) for football games, was discontinued and a panel for the improvement of Native American cultural education was set up.

In 2004, the school's mascot came under fire again, with opponents of the name being organized by an Eastern Michigan University professor. The School Board set up a committee in the fall of 2005 to look into the issue. After a series of open public meetings, the committee returned a report concluding that due to systemic discrimination, the mascot must indeed be changed. However, the committee was the subject of questions itself, with allegations that the group splintered, and none of the public forums gathered much student input. The School Board, while going over the committee's report, scheduled a final public meeting to be held in April 2006. Garnering a large turnout, the event was held in the school's auditorium, with support for the name generally coming from the student body and the community and opponents coming from academia and the Native American community. Following this meeting, the School Board decided in a in May 2006 compromise decision that the name "Braves" could still be used but the Braves logo could not be used in any athletic activities or school events.

In the Fall of 2006, after a reshuffling of School Board members following an election the previous spring, the issue was brought up yet again. In another contentious and closely divided decision, the Board chose 4-3 to retire the 'Braves' name completely on December 11, 2006. On November 27, 2007, the school board chose Phoenix as the new school mascot, and on March 31, 2008, the new logo was unveiled.

References

External links
 	
 Ypsilanti High School official main page (Archive)
 Ypsilanti Public School Bands
 Ypsilanti Community Schools
 City-Data.com

Public high schools in Michigan
Ypsilanti, Michigan
Schools in Washtenaw County, Michigan
1849 establishments in Michigan
Educational institutions established in 1849